The Ruling Passion is a 1916 American silent drama film directed by James C. McKay and starring William E. Shay, Claire Whitney and Florence Deshon. Produced by Fox Film, like several of the studio's productions at the time it was shot in Kingston, Jamaica. It is now considered a lost film.

Cast
 William E. Shay as Ram Singh, the Rajah of Mawar
 Claire Whitney as 	Claire Sherlock
 Harry Burkhardt as Harvey Walcott
 Edward Boring as Ramlaal
 Thelma Parker as Nadia
 Florence Deshon as Blanche Walcott 
 Stephen Grattan as Governor of Raj Putana

References

Bibliography
 Connelly, Robert B. The Silents: Silent Feature Films, 1910-36, Volume 40, Issue 2. December Press, 1998.

External links
 

1916 films
1916 drama films
1910s English-language films
American silent feature films
Silent American drama films
Films directed by James C. McKay
American black-and-white films
Fox Film films
Films shot in Jamaica
Films set in the British Raj
1910s American films
English-language drama films